WFEM-LP was a low-powered television station that was licensed to Heiskell, Tennessee, United States, and served the immediate Knoxville area, including Knox and four surrounding counties. The station's analog signal was broadcast on VHF channel 12. The station's signal was broadcast from a transmission tower located in Powell, Tennessee.

History 
The station was first assigned the call letters W12BU when the station's construction permit was granted on December 18, 1987. The station went on the air sometime in 1989. It had proclaimed itself as the Knoxville area's first low-powered television station, even though then-FamilyNet affiliate W38AQ in nearby Lenoir City (now Daystar O&O station WDTT-LD in Knoxville) signed on within two years prior. After the FCC began allowing low-powered stations to use traditional call letters in the mid-1990s, the station's callsign was changed to WFEM-LP.

WFEM-LP identified itself as a full-service independent station, offering a mixture of a few local programs and some syndicated programming not cleared by the full-power outlets, but they also relied on small networks that the station had secondary-basis affiliations to fill some of the program schedule. Secondary affiliations that the station had included those with America One for most of its life, the American Independent Network (AIN) from 2000 to 2001, Urban America Television from 2001 to 2006 sharing that network affiliation with then-UPN affiliate WEEE-LP, and was also a long-time FamilyNet affiliate. WFEM also aired All News Channel programming during the overnight hours in lieu of infomercials or signing off. In the early 2000s, the station also aired some programming from Military Channel. The station was granted Class A status in May 2001.

Legal troubles and closure
The actual 2011 sign-off date is unknown, but several versions of the station's website had been archived on Internet Archive's Wayback Machine from 2000 to 2008. The years leading to the closedown saw the station in legal trouble as the station's owner failed to file the required Children's Television Programming report for all four quarters of every year from 2006 to 2011, which caused the station to lose its Class A status and be reverted to LPTV status. After being taken off-the-air sometime in 2011, the station's license was returned to and deleted by the FCC on October 11, 2012 in accordance with the rule that warrants the broadcast license to be cancelled after a television station stays silent for more than one calendar year.

References

External links
WFEM website at the Internet Archive - Archived November 21, 2008

FEM-LP
Television channels and stations established in 1989
Television channels and stations disestablished in 2011
Defunct television stations in the United States
1989 establishments in Tennessee
2011 disestablishments in Tennessee
FEM-LP